The Doubles luge competition at the 1976 Winter Olympics in Innsbruck was held on 10 February, at Olympic Sliding Centre Innsbruck.

Results

References

Luge at the 1976 Winter Olympics
Men's events at the 1976 Winter Olympics